General Sir Edward Arthur Burgess,   (30 September 1927 – 8 May 2015) was a British Army officer who served as Deputy Supreme Allied Commander Europe.

Military career
Educated at Bloxham School, Edward Burgess was commissioned into the Royal Artillery in 1948. He became military assistant to General Sir John Hackett, General Officer Commanding the British Army of the Rhine and commander of Northern Army Group, in 1966 and commanding officer of 25th Light Regiment in 1970, leading his regiment in Hong Kong, Catterick and Northern Ireland. He rose to become Director of Army Recruiting at the Ministry of Defence in 1975 and Director of Combat Development at the Ministry of Defence in 1977 before going on to be General Officer Commanding the Artillery Division in 1979. He then became Commander UK Field Army in 1982 and Deputy Supreme Allied Commander Europe in 1984. He retired in 1987.

He was Colonel Commandant of the Royal Artillery from 1982 to 1992.

He was also an ADC General to the Queen.

Retirement
In retirement he has become President of the Royal British Legion. He died on 8 May 2015.

References

 

|-
 

|-

1927 births
2015 deaths
People educated at Bloxham School
British Army generals
Royal Artillery officers
Knights Commander of the Order of the Bath
Officers of the Order of the British Empire
Army
NATO military personnel
British military personnel of The Troubles (Northern Ireland)
People from Purbrook
Military personnel from Hampshire